Jill Frappier (born October 7, 1944) is a British-Canadian voice actress.

Frappier was born in Lord Louis Mountbatten's stately home, Broadlands, in Romsey, England. She moved to Canada in 1967 to work as a British hostess at the British pavilion during the 1967 International and Universal Exposition, where she met her first husband, Roger Frappier, who was pursuing a career in directing.

She was formerly known for voicing Luna in the DiC/Cloverway/Optimum Productions dubs of Sailor Moon, the title character in Keroppi and Friends, Mrs. Prysselius in Pippi Longstocking, Aunty in Pecola, Miss Finch in Birdz, Doucette in Anatole, and Fifi in Hello Kitty and Friends.

She has appeared on camera in television and movies such as Wind at My Back, Friday the 13th: The Series, The Dating Guy, Night Heat, TekWar, Spearfield's Daughter, The Twilight Zone, The Hitchhiker, Beyond Reality, and The Jon Dore Show.

Frappier is also famous for narrating a series of 4 part films called Imperfect Union: Canadian Labour and the Left.
She currently runs drama classes called "Dragontrails Drama" in Toronto, Ontario.

Filmography

Film
 Polar - Doris
 The Adventures of Bob & Doug McKenzie: Strange Brew - Gertude
 Anne of Green Gables: The Continuing Story - Mrs. Dodd
 Imperfect Union: Canadian Labour and the Left - Narrator
 In Praise of Older Women (1978 film) - Lady Teacher
 Jacob Two-Two Meets the Hooded Fang - Mother
 Strauss: The King of 3/4 Time - The Countess
 Une nuit en Amérique - Mme. Braner
 Under the Piano - Lady 2

Television
 Beyond Reality - Barbara Lambert
 Chasing Rainbows - Mrs. Blaine
 The Dating Guy - Muff
 Friday the 13th: The Series - Mrs. Dallion
 Hangin' In - Romona, Mrs. Taylor
 The Hitchhiker - Guest Star
 The Jon Dore Show - Woman
 Night Heat - Genevieve
 Psi Factor: Chronicles of the Paranormal - Bionorm Administrator
 Spearfield's Daughter - Emma Cruze
 Street Legal - K. Samuels
 TekWar - Helen Sloan
 The Twilight Zone - Museum Patron
 Wind at My Back - Helen McCloud
 Hudson & Rex - Miranda Hudson

Animation/Anime
 Anatole - Doucette
 Angela Anaconda - Additional Voices
 The Amazing Spiez! - Sherry Lewis
 Bad Dog - Additional Voices
 Birdz - Miss Finch
 Bob and Margaret - Additional Voices
 Blazing Dragons - Mrs. Shambles
 The Busy World of Richard Scarry - Additional Voices
 Flash Gordon - Additional Voices
 Franklin - Mrs. Periwinkle
 Freaky Stories - Additional Voices
 The Happy Prince - Additional Voices
 Hello Kitty and Friends - Fifi (English dub)
 Keroppi and Friends - Keroppi, Kerada ("The Frog's Secret House") (English dub)
 Jane and the Dragon - The Lady-in-Waiting
 Little Bear - Additional Voices
 Marvin the Tap-Dancing Horse - Additional Voices
 Monster Force - Additional Voices
 Ned's Newt - Additional Voices
 The Neverending Story - Additional Voices
 Pecola - Aunty
 Pippi Longstocking - Mrs. Prysselius
 Rescue Heroes - Additional Voices
 Sailor Moon (DiC/Cloverway dubs) - Luna, Luna Ball (episode 58), Queen Beryl (episode 82), Kigurumiko (episode 126), Elephanko (episode 139)
 Sailor Moon R The Movie: The Promise of the Rose (2000 Pioneer dub) - Luna
 Sailor Moon S The Movie: Hearts in Ice (2000 Pioneer dub) - Luna (cat and human forms)
 Sailor Moon SuperS The Movie: Black Dream Hole (2000 Pioneer dub) - Luna
 Stickin' Around - Additional Voices

Video Games
 Assassin's Creed: Syndicate'' - Mary Ann Disraeli

References

External links

Canadian television actresses
Canadian film actresses
Canadian video game actresses
Canadian voice actresses
Living people
People from Romsey
Actresses from Hampshire
English emigrants to Canada
English film actresses
English television actresses
English video game actresses
English voice actresses
20th-century Canadian actresses
20th-century English actresses
21st-century Canadian actresses
21st-century English actresses
1944 births